Mohammad Mansouri Davar (born 9 April 1985 in Tehran) is an Iranian Jiujitsu and MMA (Funny Boy) athlete. He is captain of the Iran Jujitsu national team. He won the silver medal at the 2014 Asian Beach Games in Phuket, Thailand and the gold medal at the 2017 Ju-Jitsu Asian Championships in Hanoi, Vietnam. He won first place at the 2009 Ju-jitsu Asian Indoor Games in Hanoi, Vietnam.He is a Member of the Iran Jiujitsu National Team in the 2018 Asian Games and 2017 Asian Indoor and Martial Arts Games in Ashgabat Turkmenistan.

References

External links 

 Mohammad Mansouri Davar on Instagram

Living people
1995 births
Iranian jujutsuka
Sportspeople from Tehran
Ju-jitsu practitioners at the 2018 Asian Games